Sheffield Brightside by-election may refer to:

 1886 Sheffield Brightside by-election
 1897 Sheffield Brightside by-election
 1930 Sheffield Brightside by-election
 1968 Sheffield Brightside by-election
 2016 Sheffield Brightside and Hillsborough by-election